= Empyelocera anomala =

Scientific classification
- Kingdom: Animalia
- Phylum: Arthropoda
- Clade: Pancrustacea
- Class: Insecta
- Order: Diptera
- Family: Ulidiidae
- Genus: Empyelocera
- Species: E. anomala

Binomial name
- Empyelocera anomala Lopes et al., 1977

Species of fly

Empyelocera anomala is a species of fly in the genus Empyelocera of the family Tephritidae.
