= Empyelocera abstersa =

Scientific classification
- Kingdom: Animalia
- Phylum: Arthropoda
- Class: Insecta
- Order: Diptera
- Family: Ulidiidae
- Genus: Empyelocera
- Species: E. abstersa

Binomial name
- Empyelocera abstersa Rohdendorf, 1963

Species of fly

Empyelocera abstersa is a species of fly in the genus Empyelocera of the family Tephritidae.
