= Empyelocera nigrimana =

Scientific classification
- Kingdom: Animalia
- Phylum: Arthropoda
- Class: Insecta
- Order: Diptera
- Family: Ulidiidae
- Genus: Empyelocera
- Species: E. nigrimana

Binomial name
- Empyelocera nigrimana Ye & Ni, 1981

Species of fly

Empyelocera nigrimana is a species of fly in the genus Empyelocera of the family Tephritidae.
