= Empyelocera =

Scientific classification
- Kingdom: Animalia
- Phylum: Arthropoda
- Class: Insecta
- Order: Diptera
- Family: Ulidiidae
- Genus: Empyelocera; Loew, 1866

Genus of flies

Empyelocera is a genus of fly in the family Ulidiidae.

== Species ==
- Empyelocera abstersa
- Empyelocera amoena
- Empyelocera anomala
- Empyelocera berlandi
- Empyelocera camillae
- Empyelocera dimidiata
- Empyelocera melanorrhina
- Empyelocera nasuta
- Empyelocera nigriceps
- Empyelocera nigrimana
- Empyelocera nitida
- Empyelocera xanthaspis
- Empyelocera xanthostoma
