= Empyelocera xanthaspis =

Scientific classification
- Kingdom: Animalia
- Phylum: Arthropoda
- Class: Insecta
- Order: Diptera
- Family: Ulidiidae
- Genus: Empyelocera
- Species: E. xanthaspis

Binomial name
- Empyelocera xanthaspis Hori, 1954

Species of fly

Empyelocera xanthaspis is a species fly in the genus Empyelocera of the family Tephritidae.
