= Empyelocera camillae =

Scientific classification
- Kingdom: Animalia
- Phylum: Arthropoda
- Class: Insecta
- Order: Diptera
- Family: Ulidiidae
- Genus: Empyelocera
- Species: E. camillae

Binomial name
- Empyelocera camillae Nandi, 1992

Species of fly

Empyelocera camillae is a species of fly in the genus Empyelocera of the family Tephritidae.
